The West Midlands Public Art Collective was group of artists active in Birmingham. England circa 1987.  Its members were:

 Steve Field
 Derek Jones 
 David Patten 
 Mark Renn
 Paula Woof

Their commissions included a relief mural for Bell Street Passage in Birmingham, installed in 1987, now lost, and a canal-side artwork under the M5 motorway in Sandwell, commissioned on the same year.

Works 

|}

References

External links 

 David Patten - Other Notes includes images of the Bell Street passage work

Collectives
20th-century British sculptors